Fitz A. Jackson is a Jamaican politician who has been Member of Parliament for Saint Catherine Southern since a byelection in 1994.

He was Chairman of the People's National Party from 2017 to 2020.

References 

Living people
Year of birth missing (living people)
21st-century Jamaican politicians
University of Wisconsin–Milwaukee alumni
Florida International University alumni
People from Saint Catherine Parish
Members of the House of Representatives of Jamaica
People's National Party (Jamaica) politicians

Members of the 10th Parliament of Jamaica
Members of the 11th Parliament of Jamaica
Members of the 12th Parliament of Jamaica
Members of the 13th Parliament of Jamaica
Members of the 14th Parliament of Jamaica